WHOM (94.9 FM, "94.9 HOM") is an American radio station which airs an adult contemporary radio format.   WHOM is owned by Townsquare Media and transmits from atop Mount Washington in New Hampshire, its community of license.  Mount Washington is the tallest peak in the Northeast.  WHOM's signal is among the strongest FM signals in the world, and the station can be heard in five states (NH, ME, VT, MA, NY) and one Canadian Province. Under proper conditions, the signal can reach as far East as Acadia National Park in Eastern Maine, as far north as Southern Quebec, as far south as Boston and as far West as the Adirondack Mountains in Upstate New York. Although the station can be heard over much of Northern New England, WHOM broadcasts from and considers itself part of the Portland radio market.  WHOM claims on its website and on the air that it has the largest coverage area of any FM station in the United States.  Sister station 103.7 WPKQ also broadcasts from atop Mount Washington, but its signal is not as strong as WHOM's.

In addition to local DJs, the station also airs the syndicated John Tesh "Intelligence for Your Life" radio show in the evening.  From late November to December 25, WHOM switches to an all-Christmas music format.

History

WMTW-FM
The station that is today WHOM signed on the air July 9, 1958, as WMTW-FM.  But it had an earlier life as a weather relay station from Mount Washington to meteorologists in the Boston area.  Along with Channel 8 WMTW-TV, which had signed on in 1954, WMTW-FM was owned by Mount Washington Television, an ownership group that included former Maine governor Horace Hildreth. For most of its early years, WMTW-FM broadcast a beautiful music format, featuring quarter-hour sweeps of mostly soft instrumentals, with limited talking and commercials.  

The WMTW stations were sold to Jack Paar of Tonight Show fame in 1963.  Jack Paar, in turn, sold WMTW-FM-TV to Mid New York Broadcasting in 1967.  In 1971, Mid New York sold WMTW-FM to Alpine Broadcasting while retaining the TV station.

With the ownership change, the radio station switched its call letters to WWMT, then to WMTQ in 1973, and then finally to the current WHOM in 1976. That call sign previously was used by New York City radio stations 1480 AM (now WZRC) and 92.3 FM (now WINS-FM).  The station offered an easy listening format consisting of instrumental versions of pop songs from artists like Henry Mancini, Ray Conniff, Percy Faith, Chet Atkins, and Herb Alpert, as well as several soft vocals per hour like The Carpenters, Dionne Warwick, Johnny Mathis, and Perry Como. This format continued through the 1980s.

WHOM
In January 1990, WHOM dropped the easy listening music for a soft adult contemporary format, dubbed "soft and easy favorites" by the station.  It continued to market itself as an easy listening station and retained its air staff. In the mid 1990s, the station began adding softer songs by contemporary hit artists and began playing current product. By 2000, WHOM was more of a mainstream adult contemporary station.

The station was sold to Fuller-Jeffrey Broadcasting by Barnstable Broadcasting in 1996.  Fuller-Jeffrey then sold most of its stations, including WHOM, to Citadel Broadcasting in 1999. Citadel merged with Cumulus Media on September 16, 2011.

Sale to Townsquare Media
On August 30, 2013, a deal was announced in which Townsquare Media would acquire 53 Cumulus stations, including WHOM, for $238 million. The deal was part of Cumulus' acquisition of Dial Global; Townsquare and Dial Global are both controlled by Oaktree Capital Management. The sale to Townsquare was completed on November 14, 2013.

References

External links
 WHOM Website

HOM
Mainstream adult contemporary radio stations in the United States
Townsquare Media radio stations
Radio stations established in 1958
Mount Washington (New Hampshire)
1958 establishments in New Hampshire